Conchobair Ó Maolalaidh was an Irish churchman who became successively bishop of Clonfert (1447-1448), Emly (1448–1449) and Elphin (1449-1468).

Biography

Conchobair was a brother of Seán Ó Maolalaidh. Their family had been expelled from Máenmaige by the Mac Hubert Burkes before 1445 and under Seán had relocated to Tuam as tenents of Baron Athenry.

Conchobair was a Franciscan friar, and was advanced to Clonfert by provision of Pope Nicholas V on the 22 May 1447. He translated to the see of Emly on the 22 August 1448, and the following year he translated again to Elphin on the 20 October 1449, where he remained until his death in 1468.

Other members of his family included

 Tomás Ó Maolalaidh, Bishop of Clonmacnoise (c.1509–1514) and Archbishop of Tuam (1514–1536)
 William O'Mullaly, Dean of Tuam (1558–1572) and Archbishop of Tuam (1572–1595)
 James Lally (died 1691)
 Gerard Lally (died 1737)
 Thomas Arthur, comte de Lally, baron de Tollendal (1702–1766)
 Trophime-Gérard, marquis de Lally-Tollendal (1751–1830)

References

 History of O'Mullally and Lally clans ..., by D.P. O'Mullally, Chicago, 1941.
 

People from County Galway
Medieval Gaels from Ireland
15th-century Roman Catholic bishops in Ireland
Bishops of Clonfert
Bishops of Elphin
Bishops of Emly